Robert Slaney may refer to:
 Robert Aglionby Slaney (1791–1862), British barrister and Whig politician from Shropshire
 Robert Slaney (ice hockey) (born 1988), Canadian ice hockey left winger